Anatoliy Oleksandrovych Azarenkov (born 5 April 1938) is a Ukrainian coach and a former footballer. He was born in the city of Odessa, Ukraine. As a player, he played for Chornomorets Odessa, Shakhtar Novovolynsk, Volyn Lutsk, Avanhard Chernivtsi, Sudnobudivnyk Mykolaiv and Kryvbas Kryvyi Rih. He coached Kryvbas Kryvyi Rih, Syria, Omani Al-Ahli, Kuwait U-20, Qatari Al-Arabi and Chornomorets Odessa. Honorary coach of Ukraine in 1983.

External links
 
 Profile at Odessa Sport

1938 births
Living people
Soviet footballers
Ukrainian footballers
Footballers from Odesa
FC Chornomorets Odesa players
FC Volyn Lutsk players
FC Bukovyna Chernivtsi players
MFC Mykolaiv players
FC Kryvbas Kryvyi Rih players
Soviet football managers
Ukrainian football managers
FC Kryvbas Kryvyi Rih managers
Syria national football team managers
Expatriate football managers in Syria
Expatriate football managers in Oman
Expatriate football managers in Kuwait
Expatriate football managers in Qatar
FC Chornomorets Odesa managers
Ukrainian Premier League managers
Ukrainian expatriate sportspeople in Kuwait
Ukrainian expatriate sportspeople in Syria
Ukrainian expatriate sportspeople in Oman
Association football forwards
Ukrainian people of Russian descent
Soviet expatriate football managers
Soviet expatriate sportspeople in Syria
Ukrainian expatriate sportspeople in Qatar
Ukrainian expatriate football managers